Stenosphenus is a genus of beetles in the family Cerambycidae, containing the following species:

 Stenosphenus beyeri Schaeffer, 1905
 Stenosphenus bivittatus Giesbert & Chemsak, 1989
 Stenosphenus cordovanus Giesbert & Chemsak, 1989
 Stenosphenus cribripennis Thomson, 1860
 Stenosphenus debilis Horn, 1885
 Stenosphenus dolosus Horn, 1885
 Stenosphenus gaumeri Bates, 1892
 Stenosphenus insulicola Fisher, 1942
 Stenosphenus langurioides Bates, 1885
 Stenosphenus lineatus Bates, 1885
 Stenosphenus lugens LeConte, 1862
 Stenosphenus maccartyi Giesbert & Chemsak, 1989
 Stenosphenus notatus (Olivier, 1795)
 Stenosphenus ochraceus Bates, 1872
 Stenosphenus penicilliventris Giesbert & Chemsak, 1989
 Stenosphenus proruber Giesbert & Chemsak, 1989
 Stenosphenus protensus Bates, 1880
 Stenosphenus rubidus Linsley, 1935
 Stenosphenus rufipes Bates, 1872
 Stenosphenus sobrius (Newman, 1840)
 Stenosphenus suturalis Bates, 1872
 Stenosphenus trispinosus Bates, 1872
 Stenosphenus vitticollis Bates, 1892

References

Elaphidiini